Baris grossacavis is a species of extinct beetle in the genus Baris of the family Curculionidae.

See also
 2015 in beetle paleontology

References

Baridinae
Beetles described in 2015
Fossil taxa described in 2015